Mother's Finest is an American rock band founded in Atlanta, Georgia, by the vocal duo of Joyce "Baby Jean" Kennedy and Glenn "Doc" Murdock in 1970 when the pair met up with guitarist Gary "Moses Mo" Moore and bassist Jerry "Wyzard" Seay. Their music is a blend of funky rhythms, heavy rock guitars and expressive soul/R&B-style vocals.

The group charted with the singles "Fire" (No. 93 Pop Singles), "Baby Love" (No. 79 Black Singles, No. 58 Pop Singles), "Don't Wanna Come Back" (No. 54 Black Singles), "Love Changes" (No. 26 Black Singles), and "Piece of the Rock" in the mid- to late 1970s.

History 
Mother's Finest issued its debut album Mother's Finest in 1972 on RCA; a second album for RCA remained unreleased until it surfaced as bonus tracks on the 2010 Wounded Bird re-issue of Mother's Finest. The group signed a new contract with Epic Records and released its sophomore effort, also titled Mother's Finest, in 1976, stirring up controversy with the ironic "Niggizz Can't Sang Rock 'n' Roll." Riding a wave of success, the band's next three albums, Another Mother Further (1977), Mother Factor (1978) and Mother's Finest Live (1979), all went gold,  helped along by heavy touring opening for the likes of Ted Nugent, Black Sabbath, The Who, Aerosmith and AC/DC.

In 1978, the band set out for Europe and took part in the Rockpalast concert series at the Grugahalle in Essen, produced by Germany's WDR television and broadcast to various countries. With only one concert Mother's Finest put themselves on the map all over Europe where the band still has a dedicated following. The legendary 1978 show was finally released on CD and DVD in 2012 as Mother's Finest – Live At Rockpalast 1978 & 2003 which also includes the band's 2003 "Rockpalast" appearance at Satzvey Castle.

After four albums for Epic/CBS in the 70's, the band signed with Atlantic Records for its heaviest album to date, 1981's Iron Age. That same year Joyce Kennedy guested with Molly Hatchet on the song "Respect Me in the Morning" from the Take No Prisoners album. Mother's Finest went on hiatus after 1983's One Mother to Another, with vocalist Joyce Kennedy pursuing a solo career, releasing the soul/R&B-styled Lookin' for Trouble album on A&M Records in 1984. She scored a Billboard Top 40 hit with "The First Time I Made Love," a duet with Jeffrey Osborne. A year later, Joyce recorded the song "Didn't I Tell You?" for the soundtrack of the film The Breakfast Club. Drummer Barry Borden, who had joined Molly Hatchet on the No Guts...No Glory album, teamed up with guitarist Moses Mo in the band Illusion, resulting in a pair of albums, Illusion (1985) and I Like It Loud (1986), on Geffen Records. Borden would later join The Outlaws for a pair of albums and has been a member of The Marshall Tucker Band since the late 1990s.

Meanwhile, bassist Wyzard toured with Fleetwood Mac's Stevie Nicks behind her 1983 album The Wild Heart, including an appearance on Saturday Night Live. Eventually, he and brother/drummer Harold Seay, who had replaced Barry Borden on One Mother to Another, joined Rick Medlocke in a revamped Blackfoot line-up and appeared on 1987's Rick Medlocke and Blackfoot album.

Mother's Finest re-formed for 1989's Looks Could Kill on Capitol/EMI Records, with only drummer Barry Borden missing from the classic line-up. He was replaced by Joyce Kennedy and Glenn Murdock's son, Dion Derek Murdock. In 1990, the band released its second live album, Subluxation, on RCA/BMG, albeit only in Europe. It was the first album to feature guitarist John "Red Devil" Hayes, formerly of Atlanta's PG-13, hired in place of the departing Moses Mo.

The band moved over to Scotti Bros. for 1992's Black Radio Won't Play This Record, a heavy Thom Panunzio produced funk metal affair, recorded with the help of former Sound Barrier member Tracey "Spacey T" Singleton on guitar. The band continued to tour heavily, especially in Europe, but did not release another studio CD until 2004's Meta-Funk'n-Physical, an experimental, hip hop- and electronic beats-oriented effort.

In 1997, drummer Dion Murdock lent his services to Kingdom Come and appeared on their Master Seven album. In 1999, Wyzard, Moses Mo and longtime Mother's Finest touring keyboardist Pascal Kravetz joined multi-national band Carl Carlton & The Songdogs, releasing a handful of albums along the way. In 2002, Moses Mo issued his solo album, Cartoon You, which features contributions from Glenn Murdock, Joyce Kennedy and Wyzard, along with several other members of the extended Mother's Finest family, Kerry Denton, Harold Seay, Johnnetta Johnson and Pascal Kravetz. In 2008, Wyzard released his solo album, Primal Incantation, featuring brother Harold Seay on drums.

Beginning in 2004, Joyce Kennedy was seen on the international Daughters of Soul tour along with Sandra St. Victor, Nona Hendryx, Lalah Hathaway (daughter of Donny Hathaway), Indira Khan (daughter of Chaka Khan), and Simone (daughter of Nina Simone). Nona Hendryx would cover Mother's Finest's "Truth'll Set You Free" off Another Mother Further with her group Labelle on their 2008 album Back to Now.

In 2010, fellow Georgia rockers Jackyl, featuring Darryl McDaniels from Run-D.M.C., paid homage to Mother's Finest with a cover of "Like a Negro" from Black Radio Won't Play This Record and also shot a video.. Jackyl frontman Jesse James Dupree had previously been in the band PG-13 with John Hayes in the late 1980s and called on Hayes to play guitar on his 2000 solo album, Foot Fetish, with Hayes and fellow Mother's Finest members, Wyzard and Dion Derek Murdock, all contributing to the songwriting. Dupree, Hayes, Wyzard and Murdock had earlier played together under the name Dent. The band recorded an album for Sony Music, which was ultimately shelved by the label and remains unreleased.

On September 16, 2011, Mother's Finest was inducted into the Georgia Music Hall of Fame.

In July 2013, Mother's Finest launched a Kickstarter campaign to raise funds for a new studio album.

In November 2014, it was announced that the band had signed a European record deal with SPV/Steamhammer for their new studio, Goody 2 Shoes & The Filthy Beast, set for a spring 2015 release. An advance single, "Shut Up", was issued on St. Nicholas Day, December 6, 2014 "as a present to all their European fans."

In November 2015, Australian label Raven Records re-issued the band's 4 albums for Epic Records, Mother's Finest ('76), Another Mother Further ('77), Mother Factor ('78) and Live ('79) as a 2-disc package.  British label SoulMusic Records would issue the 2-disc Love Changes: The Anthology 1972–1983 set in March 2017, including 2 songs from the band's 1972 debut album for RCA and a further 6 cuts from the second unreleased RCA album.  These eight songs had previously been available on CD as bonus tracks on the now out-of-print Wounded Bird Records re-issue of the 1976 Mother's Finest album.

On April 14, 2017, British label Rock Candy Records re-issued a re-mastered version of Mother's Finest's 1981 scorcher Iron Age, including a 16-page full color booklet, 4000-word essay about the making of the album, new interviews and enhanced artwork.

Members

Original line-up 
Joyce "Baby Jean" Kennedy – vocals and percussion
Glenn "Doc" Murdock – vocals and percussion
Jerry "Wyzard" Seay – bass
Gary "Moses Mo" Moore – guitar
Mike Keck – keyboards
 Sanford "Pepe" Daniels – Drums

Classic line-up 
Joyce "Baby Jean" Kennedy – vocals
Glenn "Doc" Murdock – vocals
Jerry "Wyzard" Seay – bass
Gary "Moses Mo" Moore – guitar
Mike Keck – keyboards
Barry "B.B. Queen" Borden – drums

1990 Looks Could Kill tour line-up 
Joyce "Baby Jean" Kennedy – vocals
Glenn "Doc" Murdock – vocals
Jerry "Wyzard" Seay – bass
Gary "Moses Mo" Moore – guitar
Dion Murdock – drums
T Lavitz – keyboards

1993 world tour line-up 
Joyce "Baby Jean" Kennedy – vocals
Glenn "Doc" Murdock – vocals
Jerry "Wyzard" Seay – bass
John "Red Devil" Hayes – guitar
Dion Murdock – drums
Ace Baker – keyboards

2004 line-up 
Joyce "Baby Jean" Kennedy – vocals
Glenn "Doc" Murdock – vocals
Jerry "Wyzard" Seay – bass
Gary "Moses Mo" Moore – guitar
John "Red Devil" Hayes – guitar
Kerry "Lovingood" Denton – drums
Johnnetta "JJ" Johnson – percussion & backing vocals

2014 line-up 
Joyce "Baby Jean" Kennedy – vocals
Glenn "Doc" Murdock – vocals
Jerry "Wyzard" Seay – bass
Gary "Moses Mo" Moore – guitar
John "Red Devil" Hayes – guitar
Dion Derek Murdock – drums

2018 line-up 
Joyce "Baby Jean" Kennedy – vocals
Glenn "Doc" Murdock – vocals
Jerry "Wyzard" Seay – bass
Gary "Moses Mo" Moore – guitar
John "Red Devil" Hayes – guitar
Dion Derek Murdock – drums
Carly Gibson – backing vocals
Sami Michelsen – backing vocals

Current line-up 
Joyce "Baby Jean" Kennedy – vocals
Glenn "Doc" Murdock – vocals
Juan Van Dunk – bass
Gary "Moses Mo" Moore – guitar
John "Red Devil" Hayes – guitar
Dion Derek Murdock – drums
Carly Gibson – backing vocals
Sami Michelsen – backing vocals

Discography

Albums 
Mother's Finest (1972), RCA
Mother's Finest (1976), Epic
Another Mother Further (1977), Epic
Mother Factor (1978), Epic
Live (1979), Epic
Iron Age (1981), Atlantic
One Mother to Another (1983), Epic
Looks Could Kill (1989), Capitol
Subluxation (1990), RCA – live album
Black Radio Won't Play This Record (1992), Scotti Bros.
Meta-Funk'n Physical (2003), UTR Music
Right Here, Right Now: Live at Villa Berg (2005), MTM Music
MF 4D (2011), U*ME/US*We – live album

Mother's Finest – Live at Rockpalast 1978 & 2003 (2012), MIG
Goody 2 Shoes & The Filthy Beasts (2015), SPV/Steamhammer

Compilations 
Rock Your Soul (1996), Sony Special Products
The Very Best of Mother's Finest: Not Yer Mother's Funk (1997), Razor & Tie
Baby Love (1998), Kiosk
Definitive Collection (1998), Sony International
Burning Love: Best (2000), Cedar
Love Changes: The Anthology 1972–1983 (2017), SoulMusic Records

DVD 
Mother's Finest – Live at Rockpalast 1978 & 2003 (2012), MIG

Portraits of band members

References

External links 
Mother's Finest website
Mother's Finest Facebook page

African-American heavy metal musical groups
African-American hard rock musical groups
American funk metal musical groups
Funk rock musical groups
Musical groups from Georgia (U.S. state)
Scotti Brothers Records artists
1972 establishments in Georgia (U.S. state)